Veterok Rock is a prominent rock just north of Spraglegga Ridge in the Payer Mountains of Queen Maud Land. It was mapped from air photos and surveys by Norwegian Antarctic Expedition, 1956–60, and later remapped by the Soviet Antarctic Expedition, 1960–61, and named in commemoration of the achievement of Soviet scientists in the study of space.

Rock formations of Queen Maud Land
Princess Astrid Coast